Korfia is a genus of fungi in the family Hemiphacidiaceae. This is a monotypic genus, containing the single species Korfia tsugae.

The genus name of Korfia is in honour of Richard Paul "Dick" Korf (1925–2016), who was an American mycologist and founding co-editor of the journal Mycotaxon.

The genus was circumscribed by James Reid and Roy Franklin Cain in Mycologia vol.55 on page 783 in 1963.

References

External links 

 Korfia at Index Fungorum

Helotiales genera
Monotypic Ascomycota genera